Samu is the nickname given to a fragmentary human occipital bone  (also known as "Vertesszolos man", or "Vertesszolos occipital") found in Vértesszőlős, Central Transdanubia, Hungary.  
It has since become widely known as Samu, a Hungarian short form of the name.

Hungarian anthropologist Andor Thoma  (1928–2003) initially described it as Homo erectus seu sapiens paleohungaricus. The fossil at the time was believed to be about 500,000 years old, and some literature of the 1970s  classifies it as Homo erectus. 
Analyses performed in the 1990s have revealed a significantly younger age, at between 250,000 and 300,000 years old (Mindel glaciation),  and the fossil is now classified as Homo heidelbergensis.  

The  itself had been discovered by Márton Pécsi in 1962. Also found at the site were two child teeth, Abbevillian stone tools and a fireplace. The site is now open to the public. 
A replica of the Samu occipital bone is on exhibit in the local museum  (the original is kept in the  Hungarian National Museum), as well as associated tools and fossilized animal footprints.

"Samu" has become a common name for plastic skeletons shown in biology classes in Hungarian student slang.

References

Homo heidelbergensis fossils
Fossils of Hungary
Tourist attractions in Komárom-Esztergom County